The Bradford-Maydwell House is a historic house in Memphis, Tennessee, U.S.. The plot of land was acquired by W. C. Bradford in 1853; by 1860, it belonged to James Maydwell. The construction of the house began in 1859. It was designed both in the Federal and Italianate architectural style. It has been listed on the National Register of Historic Places since December 26, 1979.

References

Houses on the National Register of Historic Places in Tennessee
Federal architecture in Tennessee
Italianate architecture in Tennessee
Houses completed in 1859
Houses in Memphis, Tennessee